The Thailand Institute of Nuclear Technology (TINT) (สถาบันเทคโนโลยีนิวเคลียร์แห่งชาติ) is a public organization in Bangkok, Thailand.

Overview
The institute is an entity established in December 2006 for national nuclear research and development. It is aimed to serve as the research body, cooperating with the Office of Atoms for Peace (OAP) who serves as the nuclear regulatory body of the country. TINT operates under Ministry of Higher Education, Science, Research and Innovation (MoST) and works closely with OAP and the International Atomic Energy Agency (IAEA).

Research programs:
 Medical and Public Health
 Agricultural
 Material and Industrial
 Environmental
 Advanced Technology

Nuclear operations:
 Safety
 Nuclear Engineering
 Reactor Operation

External links

 สถาบันเทคโนโลยีนิวเคลียร์แห่งชาติ website (Thai)
 Thailand Institute of Nuclear Technology (TINT) website

References

Thailand Institute of Nuclear Technology
Nuclear technology in Thailand
Nuclear research institutes
Public organizations of Thailand
Scientific organizations based in Thailand
Government agencies established in 2006
2006 establishments in Thailand
Organizations based in Bangkok
Research institutes established in 2006